Lankenau Medical Center, part of Main Line Health, is a 370-bed acute care, teaching hospital in Wynnewood, Pennsylvania. Lankenau Medical Center has been named as one of the top 5 hospitals in the Philadelphia region by U.S. News & World Report and received the Gold Seal of Approval from the Joint Commission.

Lankenau Medical Center’s clinical areas include the Lankenau Heart Institute, the gastrointestinal and GI endoscopy program, cancer care services, pulmonology, orthopaedics, obstetrics and maternity, including and a level III neonatal intensive care unit, as well as minimally invasive and robotic surgery. The campus is also home to the Lankenau Institute for Medical Research and the Annenberg Center for Medical Education.

History
Initially chartered in 1860 as the German Hospital of Philadelphia, the facility opened in 1866 on Morris Street in North Philadelphia. With the entry of the United States into World War I in 1917, many German institutions took new names. The German Hospital renamed itself Lankenau Hospital after John D. Lankenau, a successful German-born Philadelphia businessman who had been one of the hospital's first leaders.

The hospital moved to larger facilities at Girard and Corinthian Avenues in North Philadelphia in 1884. In December 1953, Lankenau moved to Wynnewood on the Main Line, occupying the site of the former Overbrook Country Club.

In October 1984, the hospital joined with Bryn Mawr Hospital and the Bryn Mawr Rehabilitation Hospital under a nonprofit umbrella organization, Main Line Health.

In 2010, Main Line began renovating the hospital, adding a 96-bed Heart Pavilion, dedicated to cardiovascular care, a parking garage, and a central utility plant. The expanded facilities were renamed Lankenau Medical Center.

Notable births, hospitalizations, and deaths

Births
Joan Jett, rock musician, September 22, 1958
Jacqueline Susann, novelist, August 20, 1918

Deaths
J. Pius Barbour, Baptist minister, January 5, 1974
Tom Brookshier, professional football player, Philadelphia Eagles, January 29, 2010
Leonard G. Carr, Baptist minister, June 17, 1976
Joseph J. Hersch, Pennsylvania State Representative, October 17, 1968
Hub, bassist and musician, December 16, 2021
Howard Lassoff, American-Israeli basketball player, February 7, 2013
Jack Ogden, professional baseball player, Cincinnati Reds, November 9, 1977 
David Smyrl, actor, March 22, 2016
Sally Young, professional bridge player, February 27, 1970
Flora M. Vare, Pennsylvania State Senator, May 27, 1962

Statistics 
As of 2022, the medical center has:
 Full-time Employees: 2,007 
 Total discharges: 18,475 
 Licensed beds: 370 
 Births: 2,888 
 Bassinets: 34 
 Total surgeries: 12,723 
 ER visits: 54,175

References

External links
Lankenau Medical Center website
Main Line Health website

Hospital buildings completed in 1884
Hospital buildings completed in 1953
Hospitals in Pennsylvania
Lower Merion Township, Pennsylvania
Buildings and structures in Montgomery County, Pennsylvania
Hospitals established in 1860